Căscioarele is a commune in Călărași County, Muntenia, Romania. It is composed of a single village, Căscioarele.

As of 2007 Căscioarele has a population of 1,958.

References

Communes in Călărași County
Localities in Muntenia